The IEEE Robert N. Noyce Medal is a science award presented by the IEEE for outstanding contributions to the microelectronics industry. It is given to individuals who have demonstrated contributions in multiple areas including technology development, business development, industry leadership, development of technology policy, and standards development. The medal is named in honour of Robert N. Noyce, the co-founder of Intel Corporation. He was also renowned for his 1959 invention of the integrated circuit. The medal is funded by Intel Corporation and was first awarded in 2000.

Recipients

References

External links 
IEEE Robert N. Noyce Medal, Institute of Electrical and Electronics Engineers
Recipients of the Robert N. Noyce Medal,  Institute of Electrical and Electronics Engineers

Awards established in 2000
IEEE medals